The True Lives of the Fabulous Killjoys is a 2013 comic book limited series written by Gerard Way and Shaun Simon, illustrated by Becky Cloonan and published by Dark Horse Comics. The series serves as a sequel to the My Chemical Romance album Danger Days: The True Lives of the Fabulous Killjoys, focusing on the followers of the original Killjoys as they try to fight against the tyrannical megacorporation Better Living Industries.

Synopsis
Following the aftermath of the first battle waged during Danger Days: The True Lives of the Fabulous Killjoys, the group's followers have kept to the desert while Better Living Industries continues to "strip citizens of their individuality". Only The Girl, the sole survivor of the original Killjoys, can help stir up the fight or join the masses in their mindlessness.

Development
Gerard first announced the project, that would be co-written with Shaun Simon, at the 2009 San Diego Comic-Con and in 2012 New York Comic Con stated that artist Becky Cloonan would be producing the artwork. He commented that the comic would serve as the final part of the story and that it would not be "as frantic as what people are going to expect". Way also described the story as "a coming of age story about a young girl" and that she would be "[choosing] her own path". On July 21, 2020 Way announced that the original concept of the comic would be created in a new series titled The True Lives of the Fabulous Killjoys: National Anthem.

Release schedule

Sequel 
On September 21, 2020, Gerard Way announced a 6-issue sequel for the series titled The True Lives of the Fabulous Killjoys: National Anthem, which will explore the origins of the members. On October 14, 2020, the first issue of the series was released.

Collected editions 
On May 7, 2014, two separate collected editions of issues 1 through 6, as well as the Dead Satellites one-shot from Free Comic Book Day 2013, became available online through Things from Another World. One edition is a standard 160-page trade paperback, while the other, titled The True Lives of the Fabulous Killjoys: California,  is a hardcover limited to just 2,500 copies, filled 232 pages and featured an extensive sketchbook with artwork from Becky Cloonan, Gabriel Bá, Paul Pope, Gerard Way, Fábio Moon, Rafael Grampá and Brian Ewing.

References

American comics
2013 comics debuts
Comics by Gerard Way
Dystopian comics